Shilanda-Nagdemra Dolphin Sanctuary is a wildlife sanctuary located at Santhia Upazila under  Pabna District of Bangladesh. It is one of the three river-based dolphin sanctuaries in Padma-Jamuna confluence, the others being the Nazirganj Dolphin Sanctuary and the Nagarbari-Mohanganj Dolphin Sanctuary. Home to the endangered freshwater Ganges river dolphins, it was officially declared as a wildlife sanctuary by the government of Bangladesh on 1 December 2013.

See also
 List of wildlife sanctuaries of Bangladesh

References 

Wildlife sanctuaries of Bangladesh